Chamaeza is a genus of South American birds in the family Formicariidae.

The genus was erected by the Irish zoologist Nicholas Aylward Vigors in 1825 with the cryptic antthrush (Chamaeza meruloides) as the type species.

Species
The genus contains six species:

References

 
Bird genera
Taxonomy articles created by Polbot